Blake Evans (born July 2, 1980) is a Canadian former professional ice hockey centre, who last played for Kyle Elks in the SVHL.

Draft 
Born in Kindersley, Saskatchewan, Evans was drafted 251st overall by the Washington Capitals in the 1998 NHL Entry Draft but never played in the National Hockey League.

Career

Early career 
He started his career with the WHL team Spokane Chiefs in 1996. After one and a half season, he was traded to the Tri-City Americans (also in the WHL) along with Regan Darby for Zenith Komarniski on 6 October 1997.

On 8 January 2001, he got traded to Regina Pats (WHL) along with Jeff Feniak for Shawn Belle, Joey Bastien, Justin Lucyshyn and future considerations. He made the WHL East Second All-Star Team the same year. A few months after he was re-signed as a free agent by the St. Louis Blues on 11 April 2001, and assigned to the Worcester IceCats and later the Peoria Rivermen.

Moving abroad 
On 30 August 2006, he was signed as a free agent by the Milano Vipers of the Italian Serie A.

On 20 May 2008, he joined former team mate Regan Kelly in the Norwegian club Vålerenga.

Awards and honors

References

External links

1980 births
Living people
Canadian expatriate ice hockey players in Italy
Canadian expatriate ice hockey players in Norway
Canadian expatriate ice hockey players in the United States
Canadian ice hockey centres
HC Milano players
Ice hockey people from Saskatchewan
Peoria Rivermen (AHL) players
Regina Pats players
Sparta Warriors players
Spokane Chiefs players
Tri-City Americans players
Vålerenga Ishockey players
Washington Capitals draft picks
Worcester IceCats players